Farshad Falahatzadeh (born March 21, 1967) is a retired Iranian football player who was banned for doping for one year, and he is now a manager. He was a defender for a number of clubs, most notably Esteghlal as well as Iran national football team with at least 25 plays.

Club career
He played for Esteghlal, Saipa Tehran, Bahman, 1. FSV Mainz 05, Sanat Naft, and Bargh Shiraz.

International career
He played for the Iran national team at the 1994 & 1998 World Cup France Qualification rounds, ECO Cup 1993, 1994 Asian Games, 1996 Asian Cup and Asia champion with Esteghlal 1990 and 1998 Carlsberg Cup (Friendly Tournament) and 2006 FIFA Beach Soccer World Cup.

Coaching career
He was captain and coach of the Iran national beach soccer team at the 2006 FIFA Beach Soccer World Cup and Head Coach at 2008 and 2010 FIFA Beach Soccer World Cup. He was a co-trainer for Damash Gilan in 2012, head trainer for Shahrdari Arak in 2013, and manager for Esteghlal Academi in 2014.

References
 farq katib fahtzade _ashkanjaymand

External links

World Cup 94 Campaign Team Melli
Asia Cup 1996 on rsssf

1998 Iran Team
Carlsberg Cup 1998 on cantab

1967 births
Living people
Sportspeople from Tehran
Iranian footballers
Iranian football managers
Esteghlal F.C. players
bargh Shiraz players
saipa F.C. players
bahman players
1. FSV Mainz 05 players
Sanat Naft Abadan F.C. players
1996 AFC Asian Cup players
Azadegan League players
Iran international footballers
Iranian sportspeople in doping cases
Association football defenders
20th-century Iranian people
21st-century Iranian people